Horacio Colombo (born 23 November 1934) is an Argentine former basketball player.

References

1934 births
Living people
Argentine men's basketball players
Basketball players at the 1955 Pan American Games
Pan American Games medalists in basketball
Pan American Games silver medalists for Argentina
Medalists at the 1955 Pan American Games